Suntan is a 1976 Hindi-language drama film, produced & directed by Mohan Segal on Delux Films banner. Starring Jeetendra, Rekha, Ashok Kumar  and music composed by Laxmikant–Pyarelal. The film is a remake of Telugu film Tata Manavadu (1972), starring S. V. Ranga Rao, Raja Babu, Vijaya Nirmala.

Plot
Dinanath (Ashok Kumar) is a laborer, who has determined to educate his son Kishore (Satyendra Kapoor) and make him a doctor and marry Kishore with his friend's Shanu (Indrani Mukherjee) as promised to his friend on the death-bed. Kishore promises to marry Shanu and makes her pregnant.  But unfortunately, he has other plans of making quick money. He marries Lata (Bindu) who is very rich unknowingly. They neglect and insult their parents. Shanu gives birth to a girl, Parvathi (again Indrani Mukherjee). Geeta gives birth to a boy, Ravi (Jeetendra). Dinanath becomes blind his wife Thulasi (Nirupa Roy) works as a housemaid in her son's house only without giving her identity. Ravi grows up in her hands, develops a lot of affection on Dinanath, Thulasi & Parvathi. After 20 years Thulasi reveals the truth while leaving her last breadth, Kishore will not attend to her funeral, because of his status in the society and Dinanath also dies in car accident. Now Ravi decides to teach his parents a lesson for ill-treating his grandparents with the help of Advocate Baldev Raj (Utpal Dutt) and his daughter Sarita (Rekha).

Cast
Ashok Kumar as Dinanath
Jeetendra as Ravi
Rekha as Sarita
Nirupa Roy as Tulsi
Satyendra Kapoor as Kishore
Utpal Dutt as Advocate Baldev Raj
Bindu as Lata
Johnny Walker
Master Raju as Young Ravi

Soundtrack 
Laxmikant-Pyarelal composed the film's music while Verma Malik wrote all the songs.

References

1970s Hindi-language films
Films scored by Laxmikant–Pyarelal
Hindi remakes of Telugu films